The 23rd Golden Melody Awards were held on 13 June 2012 at Taipei Arena in Taipei, Taiwan. The awards ceremony gave musical awards to musicians and songs in languages such as Mandarin, Taiwanese, and Hakka.

Winners
Below is a full list of winners and nominees
Note:Bold indicates winner of that category.

Song of the Year
Perfect landing "put me into your (ten years behind the creation of the essence of film and television theme songs on the album)" ╱ barefoot is not hot enough
Noah's Ark "Second Life (no where-End Edition)" ╱ believe music
So grow up, "So grow up" ╱ Asian god of music
Speaking of love "when it comes to love" ╱ Asian god of music
In those years, "those years, we were chasing girls" ╱ Sony Music Taiwan

Best Mandarin Album
Second Life (no where-End Edition) ╱ believe music
Wonderful Life (paperback edition) ╱ RHINOTECH music
MY LOVE ╱ RHINOTECH music
Where God is not allowed to cry ╱ Asian music
When it comes to love God ╱ Asian music
People ╱ Kung Fu Entertainment

Best Taiwanese Album
Island travel ╱ chaos sound production
Musical culture forever ╱ artery
Crescent moon ╱ universe Television
Rolling Stone music seasons ╱
Warner Music will miss scared ╱

Best Hakka Album
Liang Liang ╱ who better to create different musical life
Wo Long ╱ Mountain Dog Big Band
Lan took ╱ Rising Sun Culture
ButterfLife ╱ Wade Culture

Best Indigenous Album 
Beautiful day ╱ Harvest Publishing
Ina childhood ╱ Amis ga Wataru Orchestra
My Carefree Life ╱ Wind Music
Listen to the sound ╱ Harley-woman musical
BaLiwakes (Baal Vargas) - Nanwang sisters with the National Taiwan Symphony Orchestra ╱ angle head culture

Best Music Video
Imperial "Takasago Army" ╱ red group play, Ltd. Chong (Director: Zhuang Zhiwen)
Lonely mad "So grow up" ╱ Yashen Music (Director: Bier Jia)
My Love "MY LOVE" ╱ RHINOTECH Music (Director: Bier Jia)
Bird's Nest "What troubles you" ╱ Universal Music (Director: Zhuowei Chi)
Old Love Song "Rangers Diary Episode home in Arctic Village" ╱ Rolling Stones Music (Director: Zhou Getai)

Best Composition 
Mayday Masa╱ Noah's Ark "Second Life (no where-End Edition)" ╱ believe music
Jiaoan Pu ╱ you please give me some good rival "MY LOVE" ╱ RHINOTECH music
Xie chords ╱ So grow up, "So grow up" ╱ Asian god of music
Khalil ╱ lonely patient "? "╱ Universal Music
Tanya ╱ Speaking of love "when it comes to love" ╱ Asian god of music

Best Lyrics 
Mayday Ashin ╱ Noah's Ark "Second Life (no where-End Edition)" ╱ believe music
Li Gedi ╱ you please give me some good rival "MY LOVE" ╱ RHINOTECH music
Osamu ╱ long shot, "so what" ╱ Asian god of music
Takeo ╱ Abba milkfish 'thoughts will be scared "╱ Warner Music
GE greatly ╱ comes love "when it comes to love" ╱ Asian god of music
Jonathan Lee ╱ pregnant Pearl "primary" ╱ Universal Music

Best Music Arrangement 
Mayday Masa ╱ Noah's Ark "Second Life (no where-End Edition)" ╱ believe music
Fan Zhezhong ╱ you please give me some good rival "MY LOVE" ╱ RHINOTECH music
Xu Qianxiu ╱ meteorite "is not allowed to cry occasions" ╱ Asian god of music
Tanya, Doug Petty, Charlton Pettus, Brian Allen, Jamie Wollam ╱ Speaking of love "when it comes to love" ╱ Asian god of music
Jay ╱ sailors afraid of the water, "exclamation point (Deluxe Edition)" ╱ JVR Music

Producer of the Year, Album 
Mayday ╱ Second Life (no where-End Edition) ╱ believe music
Peggy Hsu ╱ ╱ bend fantasy boutiques music
Chen Jian Qi ╱ ╱ Asian occasions are not allowed to cry God Music
Tanya ╱ ╱ Asia God comes to love music
Large Joanna Wang ╱ ╱ adventure Boniface Sony Music Taiwan

Producer of the Year, Single 
Lu Zhen Huang, Guo Wenzong ╱ want freedom "Wonderful Life (paperback edition)" ╱ RHINOTECH music
Wang Zhiping ╱ you please give me some good rival "MY LOVE" ╱ RHINOTECH music
He official ingots, Xie chords ╱ So grow up, "So grow up" ╱ Yashen music
Edward Chan, Charles Lee, Khalil ╱ lonely patient "? "╱ Universal Music
Xue Zhongming ╱ those years "in those years, we were chasing girls" ╱ Sony Music Taiwan

Best Mandarin Male Singer
Luan Xiang ╱ put me into your (ten years behind the creation of the essence of film and television theme songs on the album) ╱ barefoot is not hot
Yoga Lin ╱ Wonderful Life (paperback edition) ╱ RHINOTECH music
Eason ╱? ╱ Universal Music
Jay ╱ exclamation point (Deluxe Edition) ╱ JVR Music
Hsiao Rhapsody ╱ ╱ Warner Music

Best Taiwanese Male Singer
Michael Shih ╱ ╱ island travel chaos sound production
Barren bright ╱ ╱ artery musical culture forever
Chris Hung ╱ ╱ Walt beautiful love song music
Yen Yung-neng ╱ ╱ Takao Run
Hsiao Huang-chi thoughts will surprise ╱ ╱ Warner Music

Best Mandarin Female Singer
A-Lin ╱ We Will Be Beter ╱ Avex we will be better
Stefanie  ╱ It's Time ╱ wonderful music
Hebe Tien ╱ MY LOVE ╱ RHINOTECH music
Waa Wei ╱ The occasion which is not allowed to cry ╱ Asian occasions are not allowed to cry God Music
Mei ╱ Are You Looking At Me (You And Me Commemorate Edition) ╱ Gold Typhoon
Tanya Chua ╱ Speaking of Love ╱ Asia God comes to love music

Best Taiwanese Female Singer
Shirley Maya ╱ ╱ you can not live without music Walter
Xie Jin Yan crescent moon ╱ ╱ universe Television
Li Yasuo ╱ ╱ seasons Rolling Stones music
Zhan Yawen ╱ ╱ Yawen Shan Bo Ying-tai music studio
Jennifer Love Lee (Chia) ╱ ╱ beautiful woman who say infinite music

Best Hakka Singer
Stuff (Tangyun Huan) ╱ happiness DNA ╱ Wo wide entertainment
Shangguan Ganoderma ╱ ╱ who hit pretty good as life pretty different music studio
Luo Sirong took ╱ ╱ embrace cultural Rising Sun

Best Aboriginal Singer 
Pull Wei Shi ╱ Lao beautiful day outside ╱ ╱ Harvest Publishing
Ilid Kaolo ╱ My Carefree Life ╱ Wind Music
Less Ni Yao ╱ Le minutes long points ╱ Harley listen to the sound of music - women
By Bai Weiji ╱ interpretation of music released

Best Band
Mayday ╱ Second Life (no where-End Edition) ╱ believe music
Tizzy Bac telltale heart ╱ ╱ musical bent
Pretenders pretenders ╱ ╱ Seed Music
Mary See the Future ╱ Yes, I Am ╱ map International Multimedia
Soda Green ╱ ╱ what you worry Universal Music

Best Group 
Kitahara Bobcats ╱ ╱ happy tribe sing new music
Free play free play ╱ ╱ Universal Music Soundtrack
New Taiwan Taiwan Kang Kang band ╱ new band "eight" foot open open ╱ Rolling Stones music
Nanwang sisters ╱ BaLiwakes (Baal Vargas) - Nanwang sisters and National Taiwan Symphony Orchestra ╱ angle head culture

Best New Artist 
Wu Nanying ╱ Wu Nanying "I just Wu Nanying" ╱ nothing more than cultural
Girl and Robot ╱ Miss November ╱ Yashen music
A-fu ╱ That's How It Is ╱ Forward Music
Ilid Kaolo ╱ My Carefree Life ╱ Wind Music
Li Jia Wei ╱ Warner Music

Best Instrumental Album 
Tsunami TSUNAMI ╱ Samoa international supplier to the Japanese
Forgotten Time ╱ stone
Rolling Ashin soundtrack soundtrack ╱ monkeys led integrated marketing
. Seediq Bale ╱ Forward Music
Reflectors ╱ Li Xinyun music studio

Producer of the Year, Instrumental 
Chung, Baby ╱ ╱ stone Forgotten Time
Wang Xiwen ╱ roll bar Oshin soundtrack soundtrack ╱ monkeys led integrated marketing
Chung's, Ken Ohtake ╱ Ken Ohtake & Friends (Ken Ohtake and friends) I Must Have Been There (deja far) ╱ Trees Music
He Guojie ╱ ╱ Seediq Bale ‧ Forward Music
Li Xinyun ╱ ╱ Li Xinyun music studio reflectors

Best Instrumental Composition 
Chung, Baby ╱ who stole the Time "Forgotten Time" ╱ stone
Wang Xiwen ╱ boy roll bar "roll bar Oshin soundtrack soundtrack" ╱ monkeys led integrated marketing
He Guojie ╱ encounter Rainbow Bridge "Seediq ‧ Bale" ╱ Forward Music
Hou Yongguang ╱ soul space "reflector" ╱ Li Xinyun music studio
Hou Yongguang ╱ sad without injury traveler "reflector" ╱ Li Xinyun music studio

Best Album Packaging 
Xiaoqing Yang (Xiaoqing Yang studio) ╱ After 75 Years ╱ Seed Music
Forest of B ╱ 4-6 pm ╱ Yashen music
Jia Wei Lai flattered ╱ ╱ Decca Records
Xiaoqing Yang (Xiaoqing Yang studio) ╱ BaLiwakes (Baal Vargas) Nanwang sisters with the *National Taiwan Symphony Orchestra ╱ angle head culture
Wei seed ╱ Ken Ohtake & Friends (Ken Ohtake and friends) I Must Have Been There (deja far) ╱ Trees Music
Mori Chen Shou Chen (keep working iso) ╱ exclamation point (Limited USB Edition) ╱ JVR Music
Nie Yong really ╱ you look at me (Pre hide Edition) ╱ Gold Typhoon

Special Contributions Award 
 Wen Hsia

References

External links
  Official Website
  Official YouTube Channel

Golden Melody Awards
Golden Melody Awards
Golden Melody Awards
Golden Melody Awards